The 1943–44 NCAA men's basketball season began in December 1943, progressed through the regular season and conference tournaments, and concluded with the 1944 NCAA basketball tournament championship game on March 28, 1944, at Madison Square Garden in New York, New York. The Utah Redskins won their first NCAA national championship with a 42–40 victory over the Dartmouth Big Green.

Season headlines 
 The Metropolitan New York Conference and the Skyline Conference did not compete during the season. Their members played as independents.
 Arkansas was selected for the NCAA tournament but was forced to withdraw after a March 1944 automobile accident injured two Razorbacks starters and killed a physical education teacher who traveled with the team as a coaching assistant.
 Utah replaced Arkansas in the NCAA Tournament and became the first team to play in both the National Invitation Tournament and the NCAA tournament in the same season.
 Army went undefeated (15–0), and the Helms Athletic Foundation selected Army rather than 1944 NCAA Tournament winner Utah as its national champion. It was the third time in history that the Helms champion differed from the NCAA champion.
 In 1995, the Premo-Porretta Power Poll retroactively selected Army as its national champion for the 1943–44 season.

Conference membership changes

Regular season

Conference winners and tournaments

Statistical leaders

Post-season tournaments

NCAA tournament

Semifinals & finals

National Invitation tournament

Semifinals & finals 

 Third Place – Kentucky 45, Oklahoma A&M 29

Awards

Consensus All-American teams

Major player of the year awards 

 Helms Player of the Year: George Mikan, DePaul
Sporting News Player of the Year: Dale Hall, Army

Other major awards 

 NIT/Haggerty Award (Top player in New York City metro area): Dick McGuire, St. John's

Coaching changes 

A number of teams changed coaches during the season and after it ended.

References